The 2012 United States state legislative elections were held on November 6, 2012, for 86 state legislative chambers in 44 states. Across the fifty states, approximately 65 percent of all upper house seats and 85 percent of all lower house seats were up for election. Nine legislative chambers in the five permanently-inhabited U.S. territories and the federal district of Washington, D.C. also held elections. The elections took place concurrently with several other federal, state, and local elections, including the presidential election, U.S. Senate elections, U.S. House elections, and gubernatorial elections.

13 chambers shifted party control, as Republicans had gained many chambers in the 2010 mid-term elections, and this was seen as a modest rebalancing.

Democrats won the Colorado House of Representatives, Maine Senate, Maine House of Representatives, Minnesota Senate, Minnesota House of Representatives, New Hampshire House of Representatives, and Oregon House of Representatives that was previously tied. Meanwhile, Republicans won the Wisconsin Senate, Arkansas Senate, Arkansas House of Representatives. The Alaska Senate went from a Democratic-led coalition to Republican control. The Washington Senate went from Democratic to a Republican-led coalition, and the New York State Senate went from a Republican to a Republican-led coalition.

Summary table
Regularly-scheduled elections were held in 86 of the 99 state legislative chambers in the United States. Nationwide, regularly-scheduled elections were held for 6,015 of the 7,383 legislative seats. Many legislative chambers held elections for all seats, but some legislative chambers that use staggered elections held elections for only a portion of the total seats in the chamber. The chambers not up for election either hold regularly-scheduled elections in odd-numbered years, or have four-year terms and hold all regularly-scheduled elections in presidential midterm election years.

Note that this table only covers regularly-scheduled elections; additional special elections took place concurrently with these regularly-scheduled elections.

State summaries

Alaska

Most of the seats of the Alaska Senate and all of the seats of the Alaska House of Representatives were up for election in 2012. Republicans won control of the Senate from a Democratic-led coalition of Democrats, Republicans, and independents, while maintaining control of the Alaska House of Representatives.

Arizona

All of the seats of the Arizona Senate and the Arizona House of Representatives were up for election in 2012. Republicans maintained a government trifecta with control of the governorship and both state legislative chambers.

Arkansas

All of the seats of the Arkansas Senate and all of the seats of the Arkansas House of Representatives were up for election in 2012. Republicans won control of both chambers for the first time since Reconstruction, thereby ending a government trifecta.

California

Half of the seats of the California State Senate and all of the seats of the California State Assembly were up for election in 2012. Democrats held control of both chambers, maintaining a government trifecta.

Colorado

Half of the seats of the Colorado Senate and all of the seats of the Colorado House of Representatives were up for election in 2012. Democrats held control of the state House and won control of the state Senate, thereby establishing a trifecta.

Connecticut

All of the seats of the Connecticut State Senate and the Connecticut House of Representatives were up for election in 2012. Democrats held control of both houses.

Delaware

All of the seats of the Delaware Senate and all of the seats of the Delaware House of Representatives were up for election in 2012. Democrats held control of both chambers, maintaining a government trifecta.

Florida

All of the seats of the Florida Senate and all of the seats of the Florida House of Representatives were up for election in 2012. Republicans held control of both chambers, maintaining a government trifecta.

Georgia

All of the seats of the Georgia State Senate and the Georgia House of Representatives were up for election in 2012. Republicans held control of both chambers, maintaining a government trifecta.

Hawaii

All of the seats of the Hawaii Senate and all of the seats of the Hawaii House of Representatives were up for election in 2012. Democrats held control of both chambers, maintaining a government trifecta.

Idaho

All of the seats of the Idaho Senate and the Idaho House of Representatives were up for election in 2012. Republicans held control of both chambers, maintaining a government trifecta.

Illinois

All of the seats of the Illinois Senate and all of the seats of the Illinois House of Representatives were up for election in 2012. Democrats held control of both chambers to maintain a trifecta.

Indiana

Half of the seats of the Indiana Senate and all of the seats of the Indiana House of Representatives were up for election in 2012. Republicans held control of both chambers, maintaining a government trifecta.

Iowa

Half of the seats of the Iowa Senate and all of the seats of the Iowa House of Representatives were up for election in 2012. Republicans held control of the state House, and Democrats held control of the state Senate.

Kansas

All of the seats of the Kansas Senate and the Kansas House of Representatives were up for election in 2012. Republicans held control of both chambers and maintained a trifecta.

Kentucky

Half of the seats of the Kentucky Senate and all of the seats of the Kentucky House of Representatives were up for election in 2012. Republicans held control of the state Senate, and Democrats held control of the state House.

Maine

All of the seats of the Maine Senate and the Maine House of Representatives were up for election in 2012. Democrats won control of both houses, ending a Republican trifecta.

Massachusetts

All of the seats of the Massachusetts Senate and the Massachusetts House of Representatives were up for election in 2012. Democrats retained control of both chambers to maintain a trifecta.

Michigan

All of the seats of the Michigan House of Representatives were up for election in 2012. The Michigan Senate did not hold regularly scheduled elections in 2012. Republicans maintained control of the chamber.

Minnesota

All of the seats of the Minnesota Senate and the Minnesota House of Representatives were up for election in 2012. Democrats won control of both chambers, thereby establishing a trifecta.

Missouri

Half of the seats of the Missouri Senate and all of the seats of the Missouri House of Representatives were up for election in 2012. Republicans held control of both chambers.

Montana

Half of the seats of the Montana Senate and all of the seats of the Montana House of Representatives were up for election in 2012. Republicans held control of both chambers.

Nebraska

Nebraska is the only U.S. state with a unicameral legislature; half of the seats of the Nebraska Legislature were up for election in 2012. Nebraska is also unique in that its legislature is officially non-partisan and holds non-partisan elections, although the Democratic and Republican parties each endorse legislative candidates.

Nevada

Half of the seats of the Nevada Senate and all of the seats of the Nevada Assembly were up for election in 2012. Democrats maintained control of both chambers.

New Hampshire

All of the seats of the New Hampshire Senate and the New Hampshire House of Representatives were up for election in 2012. Republicans maintained control of the state Senate, and Democrats won control of the state House.

New Mexico

All of the seats of the New Mexico Senate and the New Mexico House of Representatives were up for election in 2012. Democrats held control of both chambers.

New York

All of the seats of the New York State Senate and the New York State Assembly were up for election in 2012. Democrats held control of the state Hosue, and Republicans lost control of the state Senate and thus entered into a coalition government with the IDC.

North Carolina

All of the seats of the North Carolina Senate and the North Carolina House of Representatives were up for election in 2012. Republicans retained control of both chambers.

North Dakota

Half of the seats of the North Dakota Senate and the North Dakota House of Representatives were up for election in 2012. Republicans retained control of both chambers, maintaining a government trifecta.

Ohio

Half of the seats of the Ohio Senate and all of the seats of the Ohio House of Representatives were up for election in 2012. Republicans retained control of both chambers, maintaining a government trifecta.

Oklahoma

Half of the seats of the Oklahoma Senate and all of the seats of the Oklahoma House of Representatives were up for election in 2012. Republicans retained control of both chambers, maintaining a government trifecta.

Oregon

Half of the seats of the Oregon State Senate and all of the seats of the Oregon House of Representatives were up for election in 2012. Democrats retained control of the state Senate, and ended the tie in the state House, thus establishing a government trifecta.

Pennsylvania

Half of the seats of the Pennsylvania State Senate and all of the seats of the Pennsylvania House of Representatives were up for election in 2012. Republicans retained control of both chambers and their government trifecta.

Rhode Island

All of the seats of the Rhode Island Senate and the Rhode Island House of Representatives were up for election in 2012. Democrats retained control of both chambers.

South Carolina

All of the seats of the South Carolina Senate and the South Carolina House of Representatives were up for election in 2012. Republicans retained control of both chambers, maintaining a government trifecta.

South Dakota

All of the seats of the South Dakota Senate and the South Dakota House of Representatives were up for election in 2012. Republicans retained control of both chambers, maintaining a government trifecta.

Tennessee

Half of the seats of the Tennessee Senate and all of the seats of the Tennessee House of Representatives were up for election in 2012. Republicans retained control of both chambers, maintaining a government trifecta.

Texas

Half of the seats of the Texas Senate and all of the seats of the Texas House of Representatives were up for election in 2012. Republicans retained control of both chambers, maintaining a government trifecta.

Utah

Half of the seats of the Utah State Senate and all of the seats of the Utah House of Representatives were up for election in 2012. Republicans retained control of both chambers, maintaining a government trifecta.

Vermont

All of the seats of the Vermont Senate and the Vermont House of Representatives were up for election in 2012. Democrats retained control of both chambers.

Washington

Half of the seats of the Washington State Senate and all of the seats of the Washington House of Representatives were up for election in 2012. Democrats retained control of the state House, while Republicans won control of the state Senate with the help of two Democrats who caucused with them.

West Virginia

Half of the seats of the West Virginia Senate and all of the seats of the West Virginia House of Delegates were up for election in 2012. Democrats retained control of both chambers.

Wisconsin

Half of the seats of the Wisconsin Senate and all of the seats of the Wisconsin State Assembly were up for election in 2012. Republicans retained control of the state Assembly, and won control of the state Senate after having lost control through a series of recall elections earlier in the year, thereby recreating a Republican trifecta.

Wyoming

Half of the seats of the Wyoming Senate and all of the seats of the Wyoming House of Representatives were up for election in 2012. Republicans retained control of both chambers, maintaining a government trifecta.

Territorial and federal district summaries

American Samoa
All of the seats of the American Samoa Senate and the American Samoa House of Representatives were up for election. Members of the senate serve four-year terms, while members of the House of Representatives serve two-year terms. Gubernatorial and legislative elections are conducted on a nonpartisan basis in American Samoa.

Guam
All of the seats of the unicameral Legislature of Guam were up for election. All members of the legislature serve a two-year term. Democrats retained control of the legislature.

Northern Mariana Islands
A portion of the seats of the Northern Mariana Islands Senate, and all of the seats of the Northern Mariana Islands House of Representatives, were up for election. Members of the senate serve either four-year terms, while members of the house serve two-year terms. Republicans maintained control of the upper house, and Independents won control of the lower house.

Puerto Rico
All of the seats of the Senate of Puerto Rico and the House of Representatives of Puerto Rico are up for election. Members of the Senate and the House of Representatives both serve four-year terms. The New Progressive Party lost control of both chambers, to the Popular Democratic Party.

U.S. Virgin Islands
All of the seats of the unicameral Legislature of the Virgin Islands were up for election. All members of the legislature serve a two-year term. Democrats retained control of the legislature.

Washington, D.C.
The Council of the District of Columbia serves as the legislative branch of the federal district of Washington, D.C. Half of the council seats are up for election. Council members serve four-year terms. Democrats retained supermajority control of the council.

See also
2012 United States presidential election
2012 United States Senate elections
2012 United States House of Representatives elections
2012 United States gubernatorial elections

Notes

References

 
State legislative elections
State legislature elections in the United States by year